LGSF Kaunas (English: Lithuanian gymnastics and sports federation) was a Lithuanian football club from Kaunas. It was one of the most successful football clubs from Kaunas during interbellum.

History

LGSF was founded on May 17, 1922, by physical education worker Karolis Dineika and professor Juozas Eretas. It was a club that was cultivated by Lithuanian Christian Democrats party. Its basis was Ateitininkai and Pavasarininkai sports sections and independent clubs. Organization had over 80 sections. Until 1930 it published newspaper "Jėga ir grožis" ("Power and Beauty"). LGSF had strong football, basketball and track and fields teams. It was dissolved in 1944.

Football department was established only in 1927, because this game was disliked by Dineika. In that year the team started playing in B class, in 1928 it was promoted to A class. Team visited Estonia, Latvia, Poland, Netherlands. In 1939 Vilnius department was founded (LGSF Vilnius).

International games

Achievements 
Lithuanian Championship
Winners (1): 1938–1939
Runners-up (1): 1937–1938
Third places (4): 1932, 1933, 1934, 1936
 Runner-up of Lithuanian National Olympics (1938)

External links 
Statistics – futbolinis.lt

Defunct football clubs in Lithuania
Football clubs in Kaunas
1927 establishments in Lithuania
1944 disestablishments in Lithuania
Association football clubs established in 1927
Association football clubs disestablished in 1944